

Players

Current squad
As of 1 February 2013 

   ♦
  ♣
   ♦
 ♦
  ♣
   ♣
 ♣

♣  Registered with Real Madrid C
♦  Registered with Juvenil A

Out on loan

2012–13 transfers

In

 •

Out

 •

• Winter transfer

Pre-season and friendlies

Last updated: 13 August 2012
Sources:

Competitions

Overview

Segunda División

League table

Results summary

Results by round

Matches

Statistics

Squad statistics

Ordered by minutes playedLast updated: 8 June 2013
Source: Match reports in Competitive matches

Goals

Last updated: 8 June 2013
Source: Match reports in Competitive matches

Disciplinary record
{| class="wikitable sortable" style="text-align: center;"
|-
!width=30|
!width=30|P
!width=30|
!Player
!
!
!
!align=left|Notes

Last updated: 8 June 2013
Source: Match reports in Competitive matches

Overall

Last updated: 8 June 2013
Source: Match reports in Competitive matches

References

1. https://web.archive.org/web/20120715014644/http://www.realmadrid.com/cs/Satellite/en/ActualidadCantera1213_en/1330110867881/noticia/Noticia/RM_Castilla_s_Liga_Adelante_2012_13_calendar.htm

2.
https://web.archive.org/web/20120717055437/http://www.realmadrid.com/cs/Satellite/en/1330041890619/ActualidadCantera/Academy.htm

Real Madrid Castilla seasons
Real Madrid Castilla